Donald Kevin Davis is a Canadian politician and former lawyer who has served as the 50th and current mayor of Brantford since 2018.

Davis was educated at the University of Calgary where he earned a bachelor's degree in economics and political science and at Queen's University where he earned a law degree. After graduating, he became a lawyer at Waterous Holden Amey Hitchon LLP in Brantford, and he became a partner there in 1983. He worked at the firm until his election as mayor in 2018.

Davis served as Ward 2 alderman from 1985 to 1991. He was first elected to Brantford City Council in 1985 and was returned without opposition in 1988; he did not seek re-election in 1991. He  served on the board of Brantford's Progressive Conservative Party of Ontario association. Many expected that he would run for the party in the 2007 provincial election, but he declined.

Prior to being elected as mayor, he served as Governor of Mohawk College, the president of the Brantford-Brant Chamber of Commerce, the Brantford Aquatic Club, the Brantford Boys and Girls Club, and was chairman of the Brantford Economic Development Board, John Noble Home and the Brant United Way campaign.

Davis was elected as mayor of Brantford in the 2018 Brantford municipal election, defeating long-time incumbent mayor Chris Friel by over 5,600 votes. Friel blamed the loss on being out-spent by Davis. Upon becoming mayor, Davis indicated the development of the "boundary lands", territory annexed from the surrounding County of Brant, was his foremost priority. His other priorities included tackling the city's budget, the operation of the Brant County SPCA, improving safety downtown and re-organizing the homeless shelter system.

One of the major issues Davis has had to deal with as mayor is the ongoing opioid epidemic in the city. In 2019, Davis came out in support of creating a supervised injection site in the city to deal with the epidemic. In addition to the opioid epidemic, her has also had to deal with homelessness and gun violence in the community.

In 2019, Davis announced he had stage 1 renal cell carcinoma, and underwent surgery to get a kidney removed. Also in 2019, he was appointed to the board of directors of the Association of Municipalities of Ontario, Large Urban Caucus.

During his term as mayor, Davis faced controversy for allegedly trying to 'ram' through city council a decision to sell the Arrowdale Golf Course, according to leaked emails. He was criticized for not being transparent about the plan that would involve building affordable housing on the site. City council approved the sale of the club in 2020.

References

Mayors of Brantford
Living people
University of Calgary alumni
Queen's University Faculty of Law alumni
Lawyers in Ontario
Year of birth missing (living people)